National Football League Cup 2012 — Russian football tournament, held among the clubs of Russian Football National League. The first FNL Cup draw took place from 10 February to 20 February 2012 in Cyprus. The final match was held February 20, 2012. Winner of the cup was FC Ural Yekaterinburg.

Participants
Participants of the Cup became the top eight teams in the first stage of 2011–12 Russian National Football League:

 Alania Vladikavkaz
 FC Mordovia Saransk
 FC Shinnik Yaroslavl
 FC Nizhny Novgorod
 FC Sibir Novosibirsk
 FC Dynamo Bryansk
 FC Torpedo Moscow
 FC Ural Yekaterinburg

Matches

Group stage

Group A

Group B

Final matches

Final

References

2011–12 in Russian football
2011–12 in Cypriot football